is the debut album by the Swedish rock band Imperiet, released in 1983.

Track listing
"Rasera" – 3.39	
"Tusentals händer" – 4.12	
"Vita febern" – 3.19	
"Sjung inte falskt" – 3.03	
"Silver, guld och misär" – 4.22	
"Kom ihåg (den fria världen)" – 2.30	
"Guld och döda skogar" – 3.01	
"Blå från Berlin" – 4.17	
"Kontroll i Stockholm" – 3.49	
"Höghus, låghus, dårhus" – 4.12

1983 debut albums
Imperiet albums